The Attawapiskat kimberlite field is a field of kimberlite pipes located astride the Attawapiskat River in the Hudson Bay Lowlands, in Northern Ontario, Canada. It is thought to have formed about 180 million years ago in the Jurassic period when the North American Plate moved westward over a centre of upwelling magma called the New England hotspot, also referred to as the Great Meteor hotspot.

The mine was expected to produce  of diamonds a year.

See also
Volcanism of Canada
Volcanism of Eastern Canada
List of volcanoes in Canada

References

Volcanoes of Ontario
Jurassic volcanoes
Landforms of Kenora District
Volcanic fields of Canada